Metamicroptera is a genus of moths in the family Erebidae.

Species
 Metamicroptera christophi Przybylowicz, 2005
 Metamicroptera rotundata Hulstaert, 1923

References

Natural History Museum Lepidoptera generic names catalog

Syntomini
Moth genera